Richard Häussler (26 October 1908 – 28 September 1964) was a German actor and film director. He appeared in more than 60 films between 1936 and 1964. He also directed seven films between 1951 and 1957. He was born in Munich, Germany and died in Grünwald, Germany.

Selected filmography

 The Unsuspecting Angel (1936)
 Die große und die kleine Welt (1936)
 Spiel auf der Tenne (1937) - Martin Jöchler
 Der Schimmelkrieg in der Holledau (1939)
 Sensationsprozess Casilla (1939) - Adams, öffentlicher Ankläger
 Maria Ilona (1939) - Ludwig Kossuth
 Verdacht auf Ursula (1939) - Bankangestellter Kißling
 The Fox of Glenarvon (1940) - Major McKenney
 The Girl at the Reception (1940) - Dr. Groner
 Was wird hier gespielt? (1940)
 Im Schatten des Berges (1940) - Aloys Zumtobel
 The Comedians (1941) - Armin von Perckhammer
 Her Other Self (1941) - Ingenieur Partzke
 Geheimakte W.B.1 (1942) - Großfürst Konstantin
 Violanta (1942) - Marianus Renner
 Fünftausend Mark Belohnung (1942) - Krasselt
 Liebe, Leidenschaft und Leid (1943) - Paul
 Heaven, We Inherit a Castle (1943)
 The Second Shot (1943) - Georg von Romberg
 The Bath in the Barn (1943) - Sartorius - Kaufherr aus Wien
 The Black Robe (1944) - Uwe Boddin, Maler
 Schicksal am Strom (1944) - Heinrich Stahlschmidt, Kapitän der 'Wallenstein'
 Dir zuliebe (1944) - Lorenz von Niel
 Eines Tages (1945)
 Rätsel der Nacht (1945)
 Wozzeck (1947) - Tambour-Major
 Beate (1948) - Felix Wendlandt
 The Lost Face (1948) - Robert Lorm
 Girls Behind Bars (1949) - Breuhaus
 The Prisoner (1949) - Pierre
 Madonna in Chains (1949) - Professor Wienholt
 Das Geheimnis des Hohen Falken (1950) - Zeska, Bildhauer
 The Rabanser Case (1950) - Polizeikommissar Schelling
 One Night's Intoxication (1951) - Axel Peterson
 Begierde (1951) - Robert von Raviguy
 Die Alm an der Grenze (1951) - Sepp
 Christoph (1951)
 The Cloister of Martins (1951)
 Die schöne Tölzerin (1952) - Oberst Trenck
 They Call It Love (1953) - Erich Conti
 Arena of Death (1953) - Diego Moreno
 The Village Under the Sky (1953)
 Your Heart Is My Homeland (1953)
 The Red Prince (1954) - Dr. Orbis
 Das Fräulein von Scuderi (1955) - Miossens
 When the Alpine Roses Bloom (1955) - Philipp Klockenhoff
 Der Adler vom Velsatal (1957)
 Precocious Youth (1957) - Herr Rau
 The Csardas King (1958) - Graf Riedern
 U 47 – Kapitänleutnant Prien (1958) - German U-Boat Fleet Commander
 Es war die erste Liebe (1958) - Prof. Hans Lauterbach
 Aus dem Tagebuch eines Frauenarztes (1959) - Rudi Baum
 Zurück aus dem Weltall (1959) - Prof. Robert
 The Strange Countess (1961) - Chesney Praye
 The Strangler of Blackmoor Castle (1963) - Dr. Tromby
 The Indian Scarf (1963) - Dr. Amersham
 Room 13 (1964) - Joe Legge
 If You Go Swimming in Tenerife (1964) - Erik Varnhagen
 Five Thousand Dollars on One Ace (1965) - Dundee

References

External links

1908 births
1964 deaths
German male film actors
Film directors from Munich
20th-century German male actors